In Greek mythology, Melpomene, initially the muse of chorus, eventually became the muse of tragedy, and is now best known in that association.

Etymology 
Melpomene's name is derived from the Greek verb melpô or melpomai meaning "to celebrate with dance and song.".
The Oxford English Dictionary cites μέλπειν (melpein - to sing).

Appearance 
Melpomene is often represented with a tragic mask and wearing the cothurnus, boots traditionally worn by tragic actors. Often, she also holds a knife or club in one hand and the tragic mask in the other.

Family 
Melpomene is the daughter of Zeus and Mnemosyne. Her sisters include Calliope (muse of epic poetry), Clio (muse of history), Euterpe (muse of lyrical poetry), Terpsichore (muse of dancing), Erato (muse of erotic poetry), Thalia (muse of comedy), Polyhymnia (muse of hymns), and Urania (muse of astronomy).

She is also the mother of several of the Sirens, the divine handmaidens of Kore (Persephone/Proserpina) who were cursed by her mother, Demeter/Ceres, when they were unable to prevent the kidnapping of Kore (Persephone/Proserpina) by Hades/Pluto.

Mythology 
In Greek and Latin poetry since Horace (d. 8 BC), it was commonly auspicious to invoke Melpomene.

See also
 Muses in popular culture
 The Nine Muses

Notes

References 

 Diodorus Siculus, The Library of History translated by Charles Henry Oldfather. Twelve volumes. Loeb Classical Library. Cambridge, Massachusetts: Harvard University Press; London: William Heinemann, Ltd. 1989. Vol. 3. Books 4.59–8. Online version at Bill Thayer's Web Site
Diodorus Siculus, Bibliotheca Historica. Vol 1-2. Immanel Bekker. Ludwig Dindorf. Friedrich Vogel. in aedibus B. G. Teubneri. Leipzig. 1888-1890. Greek text available at the Perseus Digital Library.
Gaius Julius Hyginus, Fabulae from The Myths of Hyginus translated and edited by Mary Grant. University of Kansas Publications in Humanistic Studies. Online version at the Topos Text Project.
 Hesiod, Theogony from The Homeric Hymns and Homerica with an English Translation by Hugh G. Evelyn-White, Cambridge, MA.,Harvard University Press; London, William Heinemann Ltd. 1914. Online version at the Perseus Digital Library. Greek text available from the same website.
John Tzetzes, Book of Histories, Book I translated by Ana Untila from the original Greek of T. Kiessling's edition of 1826.  Online version at theio.com
 Pseudo-Apollodorus, The Library with an English Translation by Sir James George Frazer, F.B.A., F.R.S. in 2 Volumes, Cambridge, MA, Harvard University Press; London, William Heinemann Ltd. 1921. . Online version at the Perseus Digital Library. Greek text available from the same website.

External links

Primary sources and basic information concerning Melpomene
Warburg Institute Iconographic Database (ca 50 images of Melpomene)

Greek Muses
Children of Zeus
Ancient Greek theatre
Music in Greek mythology
Greek goddesses
Music and singing goddesses
Wisdom goddesses
Metamorphoses characters